Ferraioli is a surname. Notable people with the surname include:

Erika Ferraioli (born 1986), Italian swimmer
José Ferraioli (born 1948), Puerto Rican swimmer

See also
Nunzio Ferraiuoli (1661–1735), Italian Baroque painter

Italian-language surnames